

	

Menzies  is a locality in the Australian state of South Australia located on Kangaroo Island about  south-west of the state capital of Adelaide and about  west of the municipal seat of Kingscote.

Its boundaries were created in May 2002 for the “long established name” which was derived from the cadastral unit of the Hundred of Menzies.

The principal land use in the locality is primary production.

Menzies is located within the federal division of Mayo, the state electoral district of Mawson and the local government area of the Kangaroo Island Council.

References
Notes

Citations

Towns on Kangaroo Island